Conor Walton (born 1970) is an Irish figurative painter. Walton lives and works in Wicklow, Ireland.

Biography 
Walton was born in Ireland and trained at the National College of Art and Design in Dublin and Charles Cecil Studios in Florence, Italy. Walton has been featured in multiple Irish and international solo exhibitions.

His commissioned portraits can be found in many public and private collections, including The National Self Portrait Collection of Ireland, The Irish Armed Forces and those of Trinity College and University College, both in Dublin.

His work has also featured on book covers and postage stamps in Ireland and abroad.

Work 
Walton paints principally from life, eschewing photorealism for more painterly values. While retaining an uncanny realism from a distance, on close examination his mark-making is often gestural and the surface densely worked.

Awards
 Keating McLoughlin and Don Niccolo D'Ardia Caracciolo medal from the Royal Hibernian Academy
 1993 RDS Taylor Art Award
 2005 BP Portrait award shortlisted
 2013 Art Renewal Center Still Life winner
 2014 Art Renewal Center Still Life winner
 ModPortrait 2017

References

Further reading 
 Joseph Bravo, The Bread and Butter Paintings of Conor Walton, JosephMBravo.com, 5 November 2017
 James Waller, Conor Walton: Pessimism, Painting and the Incandescent Spark, West Cork Review, 5 February 2017
 "It's a Great Time to be a Cultural Pessimist", Interview with Conor Walton, Penduline Press, 15 June 2013
 Andres Orlowski, Access to Incandescence: The Paintings of Conor Walton, Combustus Magazine 23 May 2014
 John Seed, Conor Walton: Contemplating Higher Things, The Huffington Post, 1 September 2014
 Niall MacMonagle, Black Hole by Conor Walton, The Irish Independent, 25 November 2013
 Jane Humphries, Elements, Irish Arts Review, Winter 2012, pp. 76–77

External links 
  
 

Irish contemporary artists
Irish portrait painters
20th-century Irish painters
Irish male painters
1970 births
Realist painters
Living people
Postmodern artists
Contemporary painters
21st-century Irish painters
20th-century Irish male artists